RTP1 HD was RTP's HDTV channel. In 2008 it broadcast the 2008 Summer Olympics in HD on ZON's cable and satellite platforms. It is also marketed as RTP1 HD, when broadcasting RTP1 programming.

The channel closed on November 28, 2017, after the test period ended and RTP1 got a proper HD simulcast. The channel reopened for a few days after technical problems arose, but was shut down after the proper HD simulcast was able to broadcast once more.

Programming

Sports 
 UEFA Champions League
 Portugal national football team qualifying matches
 Volta a Portugal

Series 
 Bem-Vindos a Beirais

Soap operas 
 Os Nossos Dias (now)

Other 
 Festival RTP da Canção
 Eurovision Song Contest

Television stations in Portugal
Television channels and stations established in 2009
Rádio e Televisão de Portugal
2009 establishments in Portugal